The third cabinet of Thorbjörn Fälldin was the cabinet and Government of Sweden from 22 May 1981 to 8 October 1982.

The cabinet was a coalition minority government consisting of the Centre Party and the Liberal People's Party. The cabinet was led by Prime Minister Thorbjörn Fälldin of the Centre Party who had resigned on 5 May 1981 following the withdrawal of the Moderate Party from the second cabinet of Thorbjörn Fälldin. Thorbjörn Fälldin was reappointed on 22 May 1981 but as head of a two-party minority government.

The cabinet resigned on 8 October 1982 following defeat in the 1982 general election. The cabinet was succeeded by Olof Palme's second cabinet.

Ministers 

|}

External links
The Government and the Government Offices of Sweden

1981 establishments in Sweden
Cabinets of Sweden
Politics of Sweden
1982 disestablishments in Sweden
Cabinets established in 1981
Cabinets disestablished in 1982